Zeroshell is a small open-source Linux distribution for servers and embedded systems which aims to provide network services. Its administration relies on a web-based graphical interface; no shell is needed to administer and configure it. Zeroshell is available as Live CD and CompactFlash images, and VMware virtual machines.

Zeroshell can be installed on any IA-32 computer with almost any Ethernet interface. It can also be installed on most embedded devices and single-board computers such as Raspberry Pi and Orange Pi.

The project reached EOL in April of 2021 with the version 3.9.5.
There are several known vulnerabilities for various versions of this software: V2, V3.6x up to V3.7, V3.9.0, V3.9.3 and last V3.9.5 for example, allowing an attacker to e.g. gain root access to the device easily. The main attack vector is the cgi script in use, 'kerbynet'.

Selected features 
 RADIUS server which is able to provide strong authentication for the Wireless clients by using IEEE 802.1X and Wi-Fi Protected Access (WPA/WPA2) protocols
 Captive portal for network authentication in the HotSpots by using a web browser. The credentials can be verified against a Radius server, a Kerberos 5 KDC (such as Active Directory KDC)
 Netfilter – Firewall, Packet Filter and Stateful Packet Inspection (SPI), Layer 7 filter to block or shape the connections generated by Peer to Peer clients
 Linux network scheduler – control maximum bandwidth, the guaranteed bandwidth and the priority of some types of traffic such as VoIP and peer-to-peer
 VPN host-to-LAN and LAN-to-LAN with the IPSec/L2TP and OpenVPN protocols
 Routing and Bridging capabilities with VLAN IEEE 802.1Q support
 Multizone DNS (Domain name system) server
 Multi subnet DHCP server
 PPPoE client for connection to the WAN (Wide area network) via ADSL, DSL and cable lines
 Dynamic DNS client updater for DynDNS
 NTP (Network Time Protocol) client and server
 Syslog server for receiving and cataloging the system logs produced by the remote hosts
 Kerberos 5 authentication
 LDAP server
 X.509 certification authority

See also
 List of router and firewall distributions

References

External links 
 
 

Embedded Linux distributions
Firewall software
Free routing software
Gateway/routing/firewall distribution
Operating system distributions bootable from read-only media
Virtual private networks
Linux distributions without systemd
Linux distributions